Atsushi is a masculine Japanese given name. Notable people with the name include:

Atsushi (musician), Japanese singer and vocalist of the band Exile
, Japanese voice actor
, Japanese synchronized swimmer
, Japanese professional wrestler
, Japanese water polo player
, Japanese cross-country skier
, Japanese long-distance runner
, Japanese writer and manga critic
, Japanese actor
, Japanese voice actor
, Japanese footballer
, Japanese actor
, Japanese footballer
, Japanese sport wrestler
, Japanese Go player
, Japanese footballer
, Japanese voice actor
, Japanese professional wrestler
, Japanese professional wrestler
, Japanese tennis player
, Japanese shogi player
, Japanese voice actor
, Japanese author
, Japanese rower
, Japanese swimmer
, manga author of Soul Eater and Fire Force
, Professional Wrestler
, Japanese professional wrestler
, Japanese rugby union player
, Japanese musician, singer for Buck-Tick
, Japanese runner
, Japanese alpine skier
, Japanese basketball player
, Japanese Butoh dancer
, Japanese voice actor
, Japanese comedian and television presenter
, Japanese footballer
, Japanese Paralympic athlete
, Japanese actor
, Japanese footballer
, Japanese footballer

Fictional characters
, character from Gunparade March
, a character from Kuroko's Basketball
 a characters from Cute High Earth Defense Club LOVE!
, character from the anime and manga series Lovely Complex
, protagonist of the anime and manga series ''Bungo Stray Dogs

Japanese masculine given names